A Dog's Purpose is a 2017 American psychological comedy-drama adventure film directed by Lasse Hallström and written by W. Bruce Cameron, Cathryn Michon, Audrey Wells, Maya Forbes, and Wally Wolodarsky, based on the 2010 novel of the same name by W. Bruce Cameron. The film stars Britt Robertson, KJ Apa, Juliet Rylance, John Ortiz, Kirby Howell-Baptiste, Peggy Lipton, Dennis Quaid, and Josh Gad. The first film from the novel covers themes of loyalty, grief, dysfunctional family, and reincarnation from one lifetime to another.

The film is a co-production between Amblin Entertainment, Reliance Entertainment, Walden Media, and Pariah Entertainment Group. It was released by Universal Pictures on January 27, 2017, and grossed $205 million worldwide. It was Peggy Lipton's final film role before her death in 2019.

A sequel, titled A Dog's Journey, was released on May 17, 2019.

Plot
In the 1950s, a feral puppy wonders about life's true purpose. Weeks later, he is caught by dogcatchers, whisked away to the pound, and euthanized.

The dog is reborn as a Red Retriever in 1961. Leaving his cage at a puppy mill, he is taken by two garbage men, who plan to sell him. Left locked inside their pick-up truck, he begins to die of heatstroke, but is rescued by a kindhearted mother and her eight-year-old son, Ethan Montgomery. They break the truck's window and bring him home, naming him Bailey. Bailey and Ethan bond quickly, especially over the summer at Ethan's grandparents' farm, and Bailey decides Ethan alone is his purpose. Ethan gives him the nickname “Boss Dog”. Years pass, and after several attempts at advancing in his job fail, Ethan's father has become an alcoholic. In 1969, Ethan meets a girl named Hannah at a fair with Bailey, and they soon begin dating. They spend their summer together, happily, through senior year. They plan to go to the same college, Ethan getting a football scholarship and Hannah with an academic one. At home one night, Ethan's drunken father becomes abusive towards his mother and him. Ethan orders him to leave and never return. Later in 1971 at a football game watched by scouts, Ethan is offered a full scholarship to Michigan State University. That night, his vindictive classmate Todd throws a lit firecracker into Ethan's house, causing a house fire. Bailey alerts Ethan, who saves his mother out through an upstairs window. Ethan lowers her, then Bailey. However, he loses his rope and must jump, fracturing his leg and ending his athletic scholarship. Bailey attacks Todd, who is arrested by the police when firecrackers fall out of his pocket. Now, Ethan must go to an agricultural school, where he will learn to take over the farm. Depressed, Ethan breaks up with Hannah before leaving for college, while Bailey stays with Ethan's grandparents. Bailey ages and Ethan comes to say goodbye.

Bailey is reborn as a female German Shepherd puppy, growing into a police dog named Ellie, in the late 1970s/early 1980s, while fully retaining memories of her past lives. Ellie is partnered with lonely officer Carlos Ruiz who has recently split up with his partner, of the Chicago Police Department, and works hard at "seeking" and "finding", now seeing the job as life's purpose. They form a close bond, ending after Ellie saves a girl, kidnapped by her mother's ex-boyfriend, from drowning and is then fatally shot by the kidnapper while protecting Carlos.

Reborn in the mid-1980s as a male Corgi, Bailey is adopted by Atlanta college student Maya, who names him Tino. Lonely, he tries to find her happiness. She meets Al, a classmate, after Tino falls for Al's dog, a female Landseer named Roxy. They marry, having three children. Tino is heartbroken when one day Roxy does not return from the vet. As Tino ages and dies, he thanks Maya for giving him one of his best lives.

Bailey reincarnates again, this time as a St. Bernard/Australian Shepherd mix puppy in 2014. At first adopted by a woman named Wendi, he is named Waffles. Unfortunately, Wendi's husband neglects him, refuses to let her keep him inside, and after several years, abandons him. Waffles searches for a new life, gradually making his way back to where he spent summers as Bailey. He joyfully reunites with his old master Ethan, now in his 60s, lonely on his grandparents' old farm, now his. Not recognizing him, Ethan takes him to the local animal shelter, but later reclaims him, naming him Buddy. Sensing that he has finally found his true purpose, he reunites Ethan with a widowed Hannah, and they get married. Buddy shows Ethan that he is his “Boss Dog”, by performing tricks and responding to phrases that were known only to the two of them many years back. Ethan finds Bailey's collar, now old and rusty, and places it back on Bailey's neck, and they resume playing exactly the way they did so long ago. Bailey narrates that life is about having fun, saving others, finding someone to be with, not getting upset over the past or the future, and living for today.

Cast
 Josh Gad as the voice of Bailey, Ellie, Tino and Buddy, the reincarnations of "Boss Dog", the main protagonist. 
 Dennis Quaid as Ethan Montgomery, an old man who runs a farm.
 KJ Apa as teenaged Ethan Montgomery, a popular football player who later gets injured and must become a farmer.
 Bryce Gheisar as eight-year-old Ethan Montgomery, a young boy interested in comics and football.
 Juliet Rylance as Elizabeth Montgomery, Ethan's mother in an unhappy and abusive marriage to Jim, whom she later divorces.
 Peggy Lipton as Hannah, an old woman who is widowed and has two children.
 Britt Robertson as teenaged Hannah, the supportive and intelligent girlfriend of Ethan.
 John Ortiz as Carlos Ruiz, Ellie’s partner who trains her as a police dog.
 Kirby Howell-Baptiste as Maya, a shy young woman who adopts Tino.
 Pooch Hall as Al, a young man who dates and later marries Maya, and has three children with her.
 Luke Kirby as Jim Montgomery, Ethan's father in an unhappy and abusive marriage with Elizabeth and an alcoholic.
 Michael Bofshever as Bill, Ethan's grandfather and a farmer.
 Gabrielle Rose as Fran, Ethan's grandmother.
 Logan Miller as Todd, a former friend of Ethan’s who is vindictive and jealous of him.

Production
In 2015, DreamWorks acquired the film rights for Cameron's novel. On May 8, 2015, it was announced Lasse Hallström would direct the film. On August 5, 2015, Britt Robertson and Dennis Quaid joined the cast. On September 18, 2015, Pooch Hall was cast in the film. On October 15, 2015, Bradley Cooper joined the cast to play Bailey's inner voice, but the role was eventually performed by Josh Gad. Principal photography began on August 17, 2015. During production, controversy ensued over treatment of a dog during filming.

Release
In December 2015, the film switched from a DreamWorks Pictures release to under the Amblin Entertainment banner as per Amblin Partners' newly enacted branded strategy. The film was released by Universal Pictures on January 27, 2017. Universal also distributed it overseas, except for countries where Mister Smith Entertainment handled international sales.

Reception

Box office
A Dog's Purpose has grossed $64.5 million in the United States and Canada and $140.5 million in other territories for a worldwide gross of $205 million, against a production budget of $22 million.

In North America, it was released alongside Resident Evil: The Final Chapter and Gold, and was projected to gross $18–22 million from 3,050 theaters in its opening weekend, slightly lower than initial $27 million tracking had the film debuting to before boycotts against the film were called for. It made $466,000 from Thursday-night previews and $5.3 million on its first day. It ended up debuting to $18.2 million, finishing second at the box office behind the second weekend of Universal's own Split. The film dropped 40.6% in its second weekend, grossing $10.8 million and finishing third at the box office.

Critical response
On Rotten Tomatoes, the film has an approval rating of 35% based on reviews from 142 critics, with an average rating of 4.8/10. The site's critics consensus reads, "A Dog's Purpose offers an awkward blend of sugary sentiment and canine suffering that tugs at animal-loving audiences' heartstrings with shameless abandon." On Metacritic, the film has a weighted average score of 43 out of 100 based on 32 critics, indicating "mixed or average reviews". Audiences polled by CinemaScore gave the film an average grade of "A" on an A+ to F scale.

Andrew Barker of Variety wrote: "Viewed in a vacuum, it’s hard to fault the movie’s earnestness; Hallström’s canine cinema pedigree (which includes the superior Hachi: A Dog's Tale) shows through; and Rachel Portman's score is understandably sentimental without going completely saccharine." 
Frank Scheck of The Hollywood Reporter wrote: "While the human performers are more than adequate, there’s no doubt that the canine stars carry the day. Their utter irresistibility helps a long way in terms of getting past the corny plot machinations of A Dog’s Purpose."

Home media 
A Dog's Purpose was released on digital HD on April 18, 2017, and was followed by a release on Blu-ray and DVD on May 2, 2017, from Universal Pictures Home Entertainment. The film topped the home-video sales chart for the week ending on May 7, 2017.

Controversy
On January 18, 2017, a video surfaced on TMZ showing footage taken from the set of the film, which shows a male German Shepherd named Hercules being dragged and dipped into rushing water while visibly resisting. After a cut in the video, the next clip shows the dog being submerged in the water at the other end of the tank while a voice on set can be heard shouting "CUT IT!", and various people are then seen rushing towards the dog. The American Humane Association, which ensures that animals are not harmed in entertainment productions, announced that its representative on set had been suspended over the incident, and that the incident was under further investigation. PETA called for a boycott of the film. Actor Josh Gad, who voices the dog in the movie and was not on set during the making of the film, said he was "shaken and sad to see any animal put in a situation against its will." Director Lasse Hallström said via Twitter that he "did not witness" the actions in the video, and was "very disturbed" by the footage. Due to the release of the video, Universal Pictures cancelled the film's scheduled January 19 Los Angeles premiere.

Amblin Entertainment released a statement in regards to the incident, saying, "on the day of the shoot, Hercules did not want to perform the stunt portrayed on the tape, so the Amblin production team did not proceed with filming that shot," and  "Hercules is happy and healthy." On February 4, 2017, the American Humane Association reported that an independent third-party animal-cruelty expert had concluded that safety measures on the set of the film were in place and the video had been deliberately edited to mislead the public.

Sequel

On June 21, 2017, CEO of Amblin Entertainment Michael Wright announced that a sequel was in development. On August 26, 2018, Universal began production on the sequel, which is directed by Gail Mancuso, and was released on May 17, 2019. In addition to Quaid and Gad reprising their roles, the cast also includes Marg Helgenberger (replacing Peggy Lipton, who had become seriously ill), Betty Gilpin, Kathryn Prescott, and Henry Lau. The trailer for the sequel, titled A Dog's Journey, was released in January 2019.

References

External links
 
 

2017 films
2017 controversies
2017 controversies in the United States
2010s fantasy comedy-drama films
American fantasy comedy-drama films
Films about dogs
Films about reincarnation
Films about pets
Films set in the 1960s
Films set in the 1970s
Films set in the 1980s
Films set in the 1990s
Films set in the 2000s
Films set in Chicago
Films set in Michigan
Films shot in Manitoba
Amblin Entertainment films
Reliance Entertainment films
Universal Pictures films
Walden Media films
Films directed by Lasse Hallström
Films based on American novels
Films with screenplays by Audrey Wells
Films scored by Rachel Portman
Films about animal cruelty
Film controversies
Film controversies in the United States
Obscenity controversies in film
Animal cruelty incidents in film
2017 comedy films
2017 drama films
American children's fantasy films
American children's comedy films
American children's drama films
2010s psychological drama films
American psychological drama films
2010s English-language films
2010s American films